The 1989 Lliga Catalana de Bàsquet was the tenth edition of the Catalan Basketball League.

Group stage

Group A

Group B

Final

References

Lliga Catalana de Bàsquet seasons
 
Spanish